The third USS Myrtle (SP-3289) was a United States Navy patrol vessel in commission from 1918 to 1919.

Myrtle was built as a private motorboat of the same name in 1915 by T. B. Hayman at Elizabeth City, North Carolina. On 26 August 1918, the 5th Naval District inspected her at Norfolk, Virginia, for possible naval service, and on 16 October 1918, the U.S. Navy leased her from her owner, A. S. Rascol of Windsor, North Carolina, for use as a section patrol boat during World War I. She was commissioned as USS Myrtle (SP-3289).

Assigned to the 5th Naval District, Myrtle carried out patrol and dispatch duties in the Norfolk area for the rest of 1918.

The Navy returned Myrtle to Rascol on 27 January 1919.

References 
 
 Department of the Navy Naval History and Heritage Command Online Library of Selected Images: Civilian Ships: Myrtle (Motor Boat, 1915). Served as USS Myrtle (ID # 3289) in 1918–19
 NavSource Online: Section Patrol Craft Photo Archive Myrtle (SP 3289)

Patrol vessels of the United States Navy
World War I patrol vessels of the United States
Ships built in Elizabeth City, North Carolina
1915 ships